This is a list of historical events and publications of Australian literature during 2022.

Major publications

Literary fiction 

 Jessica Au, Cold Enough for Snow
 Jane Caro, The Mother
 Steven Carroll, Goodnight, Vivienne, Goodnight
 Robert Drewe, Nimblefoot
 Robert Lukins, Loveland
 Fiona Kelly McGregor, Iris
 Edwina Preston, Bad Art Mother
 Craig Sherborne, The Grass Hotel
 Steve Toltz, Here Goes Nothing

Short story collections 

 Mirandi Riwoe, The Burnished Sun

Non-Fiction 

 Alison Bashford, An Intimate History of Evolution: The Huxleys in Nature and Culture
 Jo Dyer, Burning Down the House: Reconstructing Modern Politics
 Madonna King, L Platers:How to support your teen daughter on the road to adulthood
 Julianne Schulz, The Idea of Australia: A search for the soul of the nation

Children's and young adult fiction 

 Lian Tanner, Rita’s Revenge

Crime 

 Dervla McTiernan, The Murder Rule

Poetry 

 Adam Aitken, Revenants
 Boey Kim Cheng, The Singer and Other Poems
 Marion May Campbell, Languish
 Lisa Gorton, Miribilia
 Sarah Holland-Batt, The Jaguar
 John Kinsella, The Ascension of Sheep, Collected Poems Volume One (1980–2005)
 Les Murray, Continuous Creation

Memoir 

 Hannah Gadsby, Ten Steps to Nanette: A memoir situation
 Anita Heiss, Am I Black Enough For You? Ten years on
 Chloe Hooper, Bedtime Story
 Anita Jacoby, Secrets Beyond the Screen
 Wendy McCarthy, Don't Be Too Polite, Girls
 Brenda Niall, My Accidental Career
 Heather Rose, Nothing Bad Ever Happens Here

Awards and honours 
Note: these awards were presented in the year in question.

Lifetime achievement

Fiction

Children and Young Adult

Non-Fiction

Poetry

Drama

Deaths 

 22 January – Craig McGregor, journalist and writer (born 1933)
 5 February – John Bryson, writer and lawyer (born 1935)
 1 March – Jordie Albiston, poet (born 1961)
 8 March – Annah Faulkner, novelist (born 1949/50)
 19 March – Alan Hopgood, playwright and screenwriter (born 1934)
 26 June – Frank Moorhouse, writer (born 1938)
 14 July – Clem Tisdell, economist (born 1939)
 26 July – David Ireland, novelist and three-time winner of Miles Franklin Award (born 1927)
 27 July – Edwin Wilson – poet, painter, scientist (born 1942)
 3 August
 Bruce Grant, writer and journalist (born 1925)
 Evan Jones, poet and academic (born 1931)
12 August – Virginia Spate, art historian (born in the United Kingdom) (born 1937)
29 August – Craig Powell, poet and psychoanalyst (born 1940)
20 September – Peter Yeldham, screenwriter, playwright and novelist (born 1927)
8 October – Angus Trumble, art curator and historian (born 1964)
17 October – Dame Carmen Callil, publisher, writer and critic (died in the United Kingdom) (born 1938)
24 November – Margaret Hamilton, children's literature publisher and writer (born 1941)
2 December
Jill Jolliffe, journalist and non-fiction writer (born 1945)
Antigone Kefala, poet and prose-writer (born in Romania) (born 1935)
16 December – Robert Adamson, poet (b. 1943)

See also 

 2022 in Australia
 2022 in literature
 2022 in poetry
 List of years in Australian literature
 List of years in literature

References 

2022 in Australia
Australian literature by year
Years of the 21st century in Australia
Years of the 21st century in literature